KPAU (103.5 FM) is a radio station licensed to Center, Colorado, United States.  The station is currently owned by College Creek Media, LLC.

References

External links
 

PAU